The Norwegian Critics Prize for Literature (Den norske Kritikerprisen for litteratur or Kritikerprisen) is awarded by the Norwegian Literature Critics' Association (Norsk Litteraturkritikerlag) and has been awarded every year since 1950. The prize is presented to a Norwegian author for a literary work as agreed to among the members of the Norwegian Literature Critics' Association. Since 1978 the Norwegian Literature Critics' Association has also awarded a prize for the best work of children's literature. In 2003 the Critics Prize for the year's best work of translation was established, and in 2012 the Critics Prize for the year's best work of nonfiction for adults was established. For other Norwegian Critics Awards, see Norwegian Theatre Critics Award, which has been awarded every year since 1939 (except 1940-45), the Norwegian Music Critics Award, which has been awarded every year since 1947, and the Norwegian Dance Critics Award, which has been awarded every year since 1977.

Winners of the prize for best literary work (adult)
A list of Critics Prizewinners is maintained on the kritikerlaget website.

Critics Prize for the year's best children's or youth's literature
A list of Critics Prizewinners is maintained on the kritikerlaget website.
1978 - Einar Økland, for Sikk sakk
1979 - Tormod Haugen, for Joakim
1980 - Torill Thorstad Hauger, for Det kom et skip til Bjørgvin i 1349
1981 - Arnljot Eggen, for Den lange streiken
1982 - Per Knutsen, for Gull og sølv
1983 - Johan Fredrik Grøgaard, for Jeg, Wilhelm, 13 år
1984 - Vigdis Hjorth, for Jørgen + Anne er sant
1985 - Mette og Philip Newth, for Soldreperen
1986 - Tor Fretheim, for Engelene stanser ved Eventyrbrua
1987 - Arne Ruset, for Aldri åleine
1988 - Mathis Mathisen, for Ismael
1989 - Klaus Hagerup, for Landet der tiden var borte
1990 - Jostein Gaarder, for Kabalmysteriet
1991 - Helga Gunerius Eriksen, for Finn Inga!
1992 - Arne Berggren, for Stillemann- historien om et drap
1993 - Laila Stien, for Å plukke en smørblomst
1994 - Unni Lindell, for Sugemerket
1995 - Mette Newth, for Det mørke lyset
1996 - Rune Belsvik, for Dustefjerten og den store vårdagen
1997 - Rønnaug Kleiva, for Ikkje gløym å klappe katten
1998 - Erlend Loe, for Kurt - Quo vadis
1999 - Erna Osland, for Salamanderryttaren
2000 - Anne Grete Hollup, for Engel
2001 - Rune Belsvik, for Verdas mest forelska par
2002 - Hilde Hagerup, for Løvetannsang
2003 - Oskar Stein Bjørlykke, for Kom til dammen!
2004 - Arnfinn Kolerud, for Den som ikkje har gøymt seg no
2005 - Marianne Havdal, for Når traktoren kjem ut er det vår
2006 - Ragnar Hovland, for Fredlaus
2007 - Fam Ekman, for Kall meg onkel Alf
2008 - Bjørn Sortland, for Alle har eit sultent hjerte
2009 - Maria Parr, for Tonje Glimmerdal
2010 - Jo Nesbø, for Doktor Proktor og verdens undergang. Kanskje.
2011 - Karin Kinge Lundboe, for Etterpå varer så lenge
2012 - Kari Stai, for Jakob og Neikob. Tjuven slår tilbake
2013 - Gyrid Axe Øvsteng og Per Ragnar Møkleby, for Førstemamma på Mars
2014 - Gro Dahle og Svein Nyhus for bildeboka Akvarium
2015 - Øyvind Torseter for boken Mulegutten
2016 - Tyra Teodora Tronstad for boken Mørket kommer innenfra
2017 - Magnhild Winsnes for Hysj
2018 – Kaia Linnea Dahle Nyhus for Verden sa ja
2019 – Tyra Teodora Tronstad for Flaggermusmusikk
2020 – Ole Kristian Løyning for Min venn, Piraten
2021 – Hilde Hodnefjeld for Uppsa

Critics Prize for the year's best work of translation
This prize was established in 2003.
2003 - Sverre Dahl, for Johann Wolfgang von Goethes Wilhelm Meisters læreår
2004 - Geir Pollen, for W.G. Sebalds Austerlitz
2005 - Johannes Gjerdåker, for Odar av Horats. Andre samling
2006 - Karin Gundersen, for Stendhals Henry Brulards liv
2007 - Stig Sæterbakken, for Nikanor Teratologens Eldreomsorgen i Øvre Kågedalen
2008 - Steinar Lone, for Mircea Cartarescus Orbitor. Venstre vinge
2009 - Kristina Solum, for Roberto Bolaños Ville detektiver
2010 - Pedro Carmona-Alvarez and Gunnar Wærness, for Verden finnes ikke på kartet. Poesi fra hele verden
2011 - Merete Alfsen, for A.S. Byatts Barnas bok
2012 - Agnes Banach, for Witold Gombrowicz’ Dagboken 1953–1958
2013 - Turid Farbregd, for Katja Kettus Jordmora
2014 - Hege Susanne Bergan for Bønn for Tsjernobyl
2015 - Anne Arneberg for Kaputt
2016 - Kristin Sørsdal for Historia om det tapte barnet

Critics Prize for the year's best work of nonfiction for adults
This prize was established in 2012.
2012 - Aage Storm Borchgrevink, for En norsk tragedie. Anders Behring Breivik og veiene til Utøya
2013 - Alf van der Hagen, for Dag Solstad. Uskrevne memoarer
2014 - Tore Rem for Knut Hamsun Reisen til Hitler
2015 - Morten Strøksnes for Havboka
2016 - Marit Paasche for Hannah Ryggen. En fri.
2017 - , for Går du nå, er du ikke lenger min datter
2018 - Jan Grue, for Jeg lever et liv som ligner deres
2019 - , for Komme til orde. Politisk kommunikasjon 1814–1913
2020 - , for Mjøsa rundt med mor

Annual Literature Critics Award
The prize for literature critic of the year was established in 1994. It is granted to a critic who has demonstrated excellence through review of literature or who has strengthened the discipline of criticism. The objective is to highlight critic's work and stimulate academic study in all forms of criticism. 
1994 - Henning Hagerup
1995 - Atle Christiansen
1996 - Geir Vestad
1997 - Ingunn Økland
1998 - Tom Egil Hverven
1999 - Øystein Rottem
2000 - Nøste Kendzior
2001 - Kjell Olaf Jensen
2002 - Marta Norheim
2003 - Bjørn Gabrielsen
2004 - Ane Farsethås
2005 - Espen Stueland 
2006 - Espen Søbye
2007 - Anne Schäffer
2008 - Anne Merethe K. Prinos
2009 - Steinar Sivertsen
2010 - Tor Eystein Øverås
2011 - Susanne Christensen
2012 - Kaja Schjerven Mollerin
2013 - Odd W. Surén
2014 - Bernhard Ellefsen
2015 - Guri Fjeldberg
2016 - Olaf Haagensen
2017 - Anne Cathrine Straume

References

Norwegian literary awards